The HP 620LX (F1250A, F1259A) is a palmtop computer that runs Windows CE 2.0. It has a CompactFlash type 1 card slot, a PC card slot, a serial link cable plug, and an infrared port. (Note this can be upgraded to a 32 MB. Windows CE 2.11 Computer)

It is internet capable by attaching an add-on modem or through an Ethernet or Wi-Fi card. Only type 1 PC cards are supported, and special drivers for Windows CE are required.

See also
 List of HP pocket computers
 HP 300LX
 HP 320LX
 HP 660LX

References

620LX